Kwabena Mintah Akandoh is a Ghanaian politician and member of the Seventh Parliament of the Fourth Republic of Ghana representing the Juaboso Constituency in the Western Region on the ticket of the National Democratic Congress.

Early life and education 
Akandoh was born on 19 June 1980. He hails from Sefwi Antobia a town in the Western Region of Ghana. He obtained his Bachelor of Science in Statistics and Mathematics  from the University of Cape Coast in 2007.

Career 
Prior to entering politics, Akandoh was assistant director in charge of National Voluntary Programme of the National Service Scheme at its Head Office in Accra.

Politics 
Akandoh entered parliament on 7 January 2013 representing the Juaboso Constituency on the ticket of the National Democratic Congress. He was elected to represent the constituency for a second term in 2016

Personal life 
Akandoh is married with five children. He identifies as a Christian and belongs to the Anglican denomination.

References 

Ghanaian MPs 2017–2021
1980 births
Living people
National Democratic Congress (Ghana) politicians
University of Cape Coast alumni
Ghanaian MPs 2021–2025
Ghanaian MPs 2013–2017